is a commercial television station headquartered in Kobe, Hyōgo Prefecture, Japan, and a member of the Japanese Association of Independent Television Stations (JAITS).

Office
the head office - Kobe Ekimae Just Square, 1-1, Higashi-Kawasakicho Itchome, Chūō-ku, Kobe, Hyōgo Prefecture, Japan
Himeji Branch Office - Kobe Shimbun Building, 78, Toyozawacho, Himeji, Hyōgo Prefecture, Japan
Tajima Branch Station - Kobe Shimbun Tajima Office, 7-23, Kotobukicho, Toyooka, Hyōgo Prefecture, Japan
Tamba Branch Station - Kobe Shimbun Tamba Office, 48-1, Kaibaracho-Kominami, Tamba, Hyōgo Prefecture, Japan
Awaji Branch Station - Kobe Shimbun Awaji Office, 2-8, Sakaemachi Nichome, Sumoto, Hyōgo Prefecture, Japan
Osaka Branch Office - Pacific Marks Higobashi Building, 10-8, Edobori Itchome, Nishi-ku, Osaka, Japan
Tokyo Branch Office - Nippon Press Center Building, 2-1 Uchisaiwaicho Nichome, Chiyoda, Tokyo, Japan
Kyushu Branch Station - 2-10-1, Daimyo Nichome, Chūō-ku, Fukuoka, Japan

Stations
JOUH-TV - SUN-TV Analog
Mt. Maya, Tatsuno, Fukusaki, etc. - Channel 36
Nada - Channel 62
Kita-Hanshin - Channel 42
Himeji, Ako, Kinosaki, Wadayama, etc. - Channel 56
Tamba, Kasumi, etc. - Channel 39
Sasayama - Channel 41

and more...

JOUH-DTV - SUN Digital TV
Remote controller button ID: 3
Mt. Maya, Kita-Hanshin, Hokutan-Tarumi, Himeji, Tatsuno, Ako, Kasumi, Kinosaki, Wadayama, and many others - Channel 26
Ichijima  - Channel 29
Yoka, Hidaka, Yamasaki and Sayo - Channel 18

Program
SUN-TV Box Seat (サンテレビボックス席) - baseball games of the Hanshin Tigers and the Orix Buffaloes

Rival broadcasting stations in the Kansai region

Radio and TV
NHK Kobe Broadcasting Station (NHK神戸放送局)
NHK Osaka Broadcasting Station (NHK大阪放送局)
Mainichi Broadcasting System, Inc. (MBS, 毎日放送)
Asahi Broadcasting Corporation (ABC, 朝日放送)
Kyoto Broadcasting System Co., Ltd. (KBS, 京都放送)

Radio only
Osaka Broadcasting Corporation (OBC, Radio Osaka (ラジオ大阪))
Radio Kansai (Kobe)
FM OSAKA (Osaka)
FM 802 (Osaka)
FM Cocolo (Osaka)
Alpha Station (Kyoto) 
E-Radio (Shiga)

TV only
TV Osaka (TVO, テレビ大阪)
Kansai Telecasting Corporation (KTV, 関西テレビ)
Yomiuri Telecasting Corporation (ytv, 読売テレビ)
Nara TV (TVN, 奈良テレビ)
TV Wakayama (WTV, テレビ和歌山)
Biwako Broadcasting (BBC, びわ湖放送)

See also
 Japanese Association of Independent Television Stations (Independent UHF Station)
 UHF anime

References

External links
Official website of Sun TV 

1969 establishments in Japan
Companies based in Kobe
Independent television stations in Japan
Liberal media in Japan
Mass media in Kobe
Organizations based in Kobe
Television channels and stations established in 1969
Television stations in Japan